The county of North Yorkshire is divided into 11 districts. The districts of North Yorkshire are Selby, Harrogate, Craven, Richmondshire, Hambleton, Ryedale, the Scarborough, the City of York, Redcar and Cleveland, Middlesbrough, and parts are in Stockton-on-Tees administered from County Durham.

As there are over 700 Grade II* listed buildings in the county, they have been split into separate lists for each district. This number does not include buildings in the former North Riding district which falls under Stockton-on-Tees, which are listed under Grade II* listed buildings in County Durham.

 Grade II* listed buildings in Selby (district)
 Grade II* listed buildings in Harrogate (borough)
 Grade II* listed buildings in Craven
 Grade II* listed buildings in Richmondshire
 Grade II* listed buildings in Hambleton
 Grade II* listed buildings in Ryedale
 Grade II* listed buildings in Scarborough (borough)
 Grade II* listed buildings in City of York
 Grade II* listed buildings in Redcar and Cleveland
 Grade II* listed buildings in Middlesbrough (borough)

See also
 Grade I listed buildings in North Yorkshire

References

External links
National Heritage List for England

 
North Yorkshire